Wilfred Hodder (6 May 1896 – 12 November 1957) was a Welsh dual-code international rugby union, and professional rugby league footballer who played in the 1910s and 1920s, and rugby league administrator.

Background
Hodder was born in Abersychan, Wales, he was a miner, hotelier, served in the Royal Field Artillery in World War I, and he died aged 61 in Morecambe/Lancaster, Lancashire.

Playing career

International honours
Hodder won 6 caps for Wales (RU) in 1922–1928 while at Pontypool RFC in 1921 against England, Scotland, and France, and won caps for Wales (RL) while at Wigan, including the 34-8 victory over New Zealand at Pontypridd in 1926, and five losses to England.

Club career
Hodder was in the Wigan team that won the Challenge Cup final when it was played for the first time at the Empire Stadium, Wembley on 4 May 1929. He was one of five Welshmen in the Wigan side. He also won the League Championship in his first season, the Lancashire Cup and League in his second season, the Lancashire League again in 1923/24, the Lancashire League and League Championship in 1924/25 and the Lancashire Cup in 1928/29.

Championship final appearances
Hodder played right-, i.e. number 10, in Wigan's 13-2 victory over Oldham in the Championship Final during the 1921–22 season at The Cliff, Broughton on Saturday 6 May 1922, and played left-, i.e. number 8, in the 22-10 victory over Warrington in the Championship Final during the 1925–26 season at Knowsley Road, St. Helens on Saturday 8 May 1926.

County Cup Final appearances
Hodder played left-, i.e. number 8, in Wigan's 20–2 victory over Leigh in the 1922–23 Lancashire County Cup Final during the 1922–23 season at The Willows, Salford on Saturday 25 November 1922, played left- in the 11-15 defeat by Swinton in the 1925–26 Lancashire County Cup Final during the 1925–26 season at The Cliff, Broughton on Wednesday 9 December 1925, and played right-, i.e. number 10, in the 5-4 victory over Widnes in the 1928–29 Lancashire County Cup Final during the 1928–29 season at The Willows, Salford on Saturday 24 November 1928.

References

External links
Statistics at wigan.rlfans.com
(archived by web.archive.org) Statistics at newportgwentdragons.com
(archived by web.archive.org) Profile at ww1talk.co.uk

1896 births
1957 deaths
British Army personnel of World War I 
British hoteliers
British rugby league administrators
Dual-code rugby internationals
Rugby union players from Torfaen
Pontypool RFC players
Royal Field Artillery soldiers
Rugby league players from Torfaen
Rugby league props
Rugby league second-rows
Rugby union locks
Rugby union players from Abersychan
Talywain RFC players
Wales international rugby union players
Wales national rugby league team players
Welsh miners
Welsh rugby league players
Welsh rugby union players
Wigan Warriors players